Iben Tinning (born 4 February 1974 in Copenhagen) is a Danish professional golfer. Her first two wins on the Ladies European Tour (LET) came in 2002. In 2003, she won the LPGA Tour's Qualifying Tournament, but her 2004 LPGA rookie season was disappointing and she lost her card. Back in Europe, in 2005 she finished top of the Order of Merit, becoming the first Danish golfer to top the money list on any major international tour. As of the end of the 2005 season she had won five tournaments on the LET. She was a member of the European Solheim Cup team in 2002, 2003 and 2005.

In 2007 Tinning played in the Solheim Cup losing her singles match to Juli Inkster.

Tinning also led the Dubai Ladies Masters after 70 holes, before Annika Sörenstam sunk a 17-foot birdie putt on 17 to tie Tinning who missed an 8-footer for birdie. On the par-5 18th, Tinning hit her approach onto the green, only to have it spin back into the water, allowing Sörenstam the tournament victory.

In 2010 Tinning announced that she would be retiring at the end of the season due to a lingering hip injury. She played her last tournament at the season-ending Omega Dubai Ladies Masters on the Ladies Europe Tour and won the tournament.

Ladies European Tour (6)
2002 (3) Ladies Irish Open, La Perla Ladies Italian Open
2005 (2) Open de Espana Femenino, BMW Ladies Italian Open, Nykredit Masters
2010 (1) Omega Dubai Ladies Masters

Team appearances
Amateur
European Ladies' Team Championship (representing Denmark): 1993, 1995
Espirito Santo Trophy (representing Denmark): 1994

Professional
Solheim Cup (representing Europe): 2002, 2003 (winners), 2005, 2007
World Cup (representing Denmark): 2007

External links

Danish female golfers
Ladies European Tour golfers
LPGA Tour golfers
Solheim Cup competitors for Europe
Sportspeople from Copenhagen
1974 births
Living people